Scopula amseli is a moth of the family Geometridae. It is endemic to Iran.

References

Moths described in 1967
amseli
Endemic fauna of Iran
Moths of Asia